In the African Regional qualifying process, 14 of the 15 eligible IRB member nations took part (South Africa had already qualified from Rugby World Cup 2007).

The qualifying process began with playoffs in May, 2008. The 2008–09 Africa Cup doubled as the qualifying tournament, with the winner being Africa's direct qualifier.  The runner-up of the tournament will be entered into the four-team World Cup playoff for the 20th 2011 Rugby World Cup finalist berth.

The Cup was decided first by four pools of three teams with the pool winners qualifying for the semi-finals.

Namibia swept Tunisia in a two-legged final, qualifying for Pool D of the 2011 Rugby World Cup, while Tunisia advanced to the Final Place Playoff.

Preliminary round: May 2008
Two single-legged playoffs were used to cut the nations down from the 14 eligible nations to the 12 who would compete for the 2008–09 Africa Cup.  Preliminary round teams were the lowest ranked teams in the north and south respectively.  Nigeria and Swaziland were eliminated in this round.

Matches

Round 1: June / August 2008

Pool winners qualified for the semi-finals.  Pools were determined through world rankings. 

Bonus point system:

4 points for a win
2 for a draw
0 for a loss
1 point for scoring four tries in a game
1 point for losing by seven points or less.

Pool A
{| class="wikitable"
|-
!width=165|Team
!width=40|Played
!width=40|Won
!width=40|Drawn
!width=40|Lost
!width=40|For
!width=40|Against
!width=40|Difference
!width=40|TB
!width=40|LB
!width=40|Points
|- bgcolor=#ccffcc align=center
|align=left| 
|2||2||0||0||48||31||+17||1||0||9
|- align=center
|align=left| 
|1||0||0||1||10||13||-3||0||1||1
|- align=center
|align=left| 
|1||0||0||1||21||35||-14||0||0||0
|}

Matches

Pool B
{| class="wikitable"
|-
!width=165|Team
!width=40|Played
!width=40|Won
!width=40|Drawn
!width=40|Lost
!width=40|For
!width=40|Against
!width=40|Difference
!width=40|TB
!width=40|LB
!width=40|Points
|- bgcolor=#ccffcc align=center
|align=left|  
|2||2||0||0||53||18||+35||1||0||9
|- align=center
|align=left| 
|2||1||0||1||38||39||-1||1||0||5
|- align=center
|align=left| 
|2||0||0||2||27||61||-34||0||0||0
|}

Matches

Pool C
{| class="wikitable"
|-
!width=165|Team
!width=40|Played
!width=40|Won
!width=40|Drawn
!width=40|Lost
!width=40|For
!width=40|Against
!width=40|Difference
!width=40|TB
!width=40|LB
!width=40|Points
|- bgcolor=#ccffcc align=center
|align=left| 
|2||2||0||0||60||25||+35||1||0||9
|- align=center
|align=left| 
|2||1||0||1||91||52||+39||1||0||5
|- align=center
|align=left| 
|2||0||0||2||18||92||-74||0||1||1
|}

Matches

Pool D
{| class="wikitable"
|-
!width=165|Team
!width=40|Played
!width=40|Won
!width=40|Drawn
!width=40|Lost
!width=40|For
!width=40|Against
!width=40|Difference
!width=40|TB
!width=40|LB
!width=40|Points
|- bgcolor=#ccffcc align=center
|align=left| 
|2||2||0||0||59||32||+27||2||0||10
|- align=center
|align=left| 
|2||1||0||1||67||47||+20||1||0||5
|- align=center
|align=left| 
|2||0||0||2||25||72||-47||0||0||0
|}

Matches

Round 2: semi-finals - 2009

Winners on aggregate progress to Round Three.

Round 3: qualification final
Namibia and Tunisia competed for Africa's automatic place in the 2011 Rugby World Cup finals in New Zealand over two legs, with Namibia qualifying for their fourth consecutive world cup.  Tunisia faced Romania, the third-placed team from Europe, in the semi-finals of the Play-off series.

Namibia won the series 2-0, with an aggregate score of 40-23.

See also
2011 Rugby World Cup qualifying

References

External links
 Confirmation from CAR
Competition outline

2011
Africa
2008 in African rugby union
2009 in African rugby union